Uroboros is an outdoor 1979 sculpture by Charles Kibby, located at Westmoreland Park in the Sellwood neighborhood of southeast Portland, Oregon. It is a modern depiction of the uroboros, an ancient Egyptian and Greek symbol depicting a serpent or dragon eating its own tail.

Description and history

According to the Regional Arts & Culture Council, which administers the work, the cast concrete sculpture measures  x  x  and rests on a base that measures  x  x . The organization lists "MAC 1979–80" as the funding source. However, the Smithsonian Institution lists the sculpture's measurements as  x  x , on a base that measures approximately  x  x . The Smithsonian categorizes Uroboros as abstract ("geometric") and notes that it was commissioned by the Comprehensive Employment and Training Act (CETA) before being donated to the park.

The sculpture is part of the City of Portland and Multnomah County Public Art Collection courtesy of the Regional Arts & Culture Council.

See also
 1979 in art
 CETA Employment of Artists

References

External links

 Uroboros at the Public Art Archive

1979 establishments in Oregon
1979 sculptures
Concrete sculptures in Oregon
Outdoor sculptures in Portland, Oregon
Sellwood-Moreland, Portland, Oregon